Curtis Island may refer to:

 Curtis Island (Queensland), an island in Australia
 Curtis Island, Queensland, a locality in the Gladstone Region in Australia
 Curtis Island National Park, Queensland
 Curtis Island (Tasmania), Australia
 Curtis Island, New Zealand, in the Kermadec Islands
 Curtis Island (Maine), in the United States
 Curtis Island Light, Maine